Bedikat chametz, or bedikas chametz is the search before the Jewish Holiday of Pesach for chametz. The search takes place after nightfall on the evening before Pesach (the night of the 14th of the Hebrew month of Nisan, as stated in the Mishnah tractate Pesachim). When Pesach starts on Saturday night, bedikat chametz takes place on Thursday night (two nights before Pesach).

The Process 

A candle is lit in addition to electric lights. Flashlights can be used to assist as well. A blessing is recited if the search is performed on the 14th (or on the 13th when the 14th is on a Friday), but not when an earlier search is performed for various reasons.

Since according to some, a blessing in vain – a bracha levatala – occurs if no chametz was found in the house, there is a widespread custom to 'seed' the area to be searched. Prior to bedikat chametz, several (usually ten) pieces of chametz are hidden around the house. These pieces must be small and should be wrapped so that crumbs do not escape. 

Traditionally, a feather and a wooden spoon are used, and whenever a piece of chametz is found (whether one of the hidden pieces or another that is discovered unexpectedly), the feather is used to sweep the piece of chametz into the wooden spoon, which is then used to place it in a bag. It is best to use a candle to illuminate the areas; however, it is perfectly acceptable to use a flashlight or other light source. In some traditions, searchers also carry a bell to announce the discovery of chametz. 

The reasons for the candle, feather and spoon is as follows:  

 Candle – candles illuminate and hyper focus their light on areas such as cracks and crevices.  
 Feather – used throughout the year to egg the challah, and therefore burnt in the chametz.  
 Wooden spoon – wooden spoons cannot be kashered and therefore "wooden" spoons that were imbued with the flavor of chametz were burnt together with the chametz.

It is for most very impractical following through with custom with above described tools.
 
Every part of every room of the house where chametz may possibly be found must be searched using this process. Rooms where chametz is not normally brought (such as a bathroom) need not be searched.

Modern versions of this tradition have adapted to include flashlights, glowsticks, and occasionally a roomba with a candle taped to the top.

Earlier search
One who is leaving one's property prior to the night of the 14th, but is not selling the property is required to perform a search without a blessing.

Customs
The customary number of pieces of chametz to place is 10. Then they would return to each corner and collect the piece, bless '. . . to destroy chametz' upon it, and bundle the pieces into a single vessel to burn on the next morning . . . to remind you of the ten impurities, in order to destroy them and remove them from the world."

References

External links
 Laws of Bedikas Chametz
 "The Search for Chametz" Questions and Answers
HaRav Eliezer Melamed: The Time for Bedikat Ĥametz in Peninei Halakha

Positive Mitzvoth
Nisan
Passover
April observances
Hebrew words and phrases in Jewish law